Husby is a locality situated in Hedemora Municipality, Dalarna County, Sweden.

History
The village of Husby had a population of 256 inhabitants in 2010. It is the site of Husby Church (Husby kyrka).

Husby Church dates from the first half of the 13th century, but gained much of its present form at the time of an extension in 1779–1782.

Husby kungsgård was a former royal estate dating into the 13th century. The current building was designed in the early 18th century.

Näs kungsgård was designed in 1686 by Erik Dahlbergh (1625–1703). It served as the  headquarters of the Dalarna Regiment  (Dalregementet) from 1683–1813.

Sports
The following sports clubs are located in Husby:
 Husby AIK

References

Populated places in Dalarna County
Populated places in Hedemora Municipality